Frank X Walker (born June 11, 1961) is an African-American poet from Danville, Kentucky. Walker coined the word "Affrilachia", signifying the importance of the African-American presence in Appalachia: the "new word ... spoke to the union of Appalachian identity and the region's African-American culture and history".  He is a Professor in the English department at the University of Kentucky and was the Poet Laureate of Kentucky from 2013-2015.

Biography
Walker was born Frank Walker, Jr., in Danville, Kentucky, the second of eleven children. He grew up in Danville, where the family lived in public housing projects. He was an avid reader as a child. Walker describes himself as both a "nerd" and an athlete in his teenage years. At Danville High School, he played football on the school team, was a member of several clubs, and was twice elected class president.

He was recruited to attend the University of Kentucky in engineering, but changed his major to English. Gurney Norman was one of his writing teachers at the University of Kentucky, where he received his undergraduate degree.  Walker is a charter member of the Mu Theta chapter of Phi Beta Sigma fraternity at the University of Kentucky.  He now holds life membership within the organization. It was during his college years that he adopted the middle initial "X", which was given to him by friends. He completed an MFA in Writing at Spalding University in May 2003.

A founding member of the Affrilachian Poets, he is the founding editor (2007) and publisher of PLUCK!, the new Journal of Affrilachian Art & Culture. In January 2010, he returned to the University of Kentucky to accept a position as professor in the English Department. In 2013, he was appointed Poet Laureate of Kentucky, the first African-American to hold that position.

Walker has published five volumes of poetry; Buffalo Dance: The Journey of York won the 2004 Lillian Smith Book Award. Walker's poems have been converted into a stage production by the University of Kentucky Theatre department. Walker was involved in the documentary Coal Black Voices, where he was a consulting producer.

Walker is Founder and Executive Director of the Bluegrass Black Arts Consortium, Program Coordinator of the University of Kentucky's King Cultural Center, and Assistant Director of Purdue University's Black Cultural Center. He regularly teaches in writing programs like Fishtrap in Oregon and SplitRock at the University of Minnesota.

Awards
 2004 Winner of the Lillian Smith Book Award
 2006 Thomas D. Clark Literary Award for Excellence, Actors Theatre's Keeper of the Chronicle Award
 2005 Recipient of a $75,000 Lannan Literary Fellowship in Poetry
 Kentucky Arts Council Al Smith Fellowship recipient
 2013-14 Kentucky Poet Laureate
 2014 NAACP Image Award: Outstanding Literary Work in Poetry.

Work

Poetry
About Flight.  Accents Publishing. 2015. .
Turn Me Loose: The Unghosting of Medgar Evers. University of Georgia Press. 2013. .
Isaac Murphy: I Dedicate This Ride (Old Cove Press, 2010) 
 
 Black Box (Old Cove Press, 2005).  
 
 Affrilachia (Old Cove Press, 2000).

Editor

Video
 Writing: Getting Ideas on Paper, PBS's GED Connection Series
 In Performance At the Governor's Mansion
 Living the Story: The Civil Rights Movement in Kentucky.

Video producer
 Coal Black Voices  (the History of the Affrilachian Poets), consulting producer, received the 2002-2003 Jesse Stuart Award presented by the Kentucky School Media Association
 KY2NYC: Art/life & 9.11, exploring the effects of 9.11 on the arts community.

References

External links
 
Author's website
Coal Black Voices documentary

1961 births
Affrilachian Poets
African-American academics
African-American educators
African-American history in Appalachia
African-American poets
Appalachian writers
Living people
Northern Kentucky University faculty
Poets from Kentucky
Poets Laureate of Kentucky
Spalding University alumni
University of Kentucky alumni
Writers from Danville, Kentucky
21st-century American poets
21st-century African-American writers
20th-century African-American people